Shadows is a software package for the calculation and drawing of sundials and astrolabes, available as a freeware in its base level.

It has been developed by François Blateyron, software developer and amateur astronomer, who made it available on Internet since 1997 and continues to improve it. It is used worldwide by thousands of sundial enthusiasts. It is compatible with Windows 11/10, 8.x and 7.  Shadows is available in three levels: Shadows is a freeware; Since version 3.0, it also supports the creation of astrolabes.

Description
Shadows calculates various types of sundials:
 plane sundials with polar style (any orientation or reclination)
 horizontal or vertical analemmatic sundial
 horizontal or vertical bifilar sundial
 cylindrical sundial

as well as astrolabes:
 planispheric astrolabe
 universal astrolabe
 mariners astrolabe

Shadows is software restricted to the Windows operating system. It is simple to use but does not aim to be universal. It
draws the sundial on screen and prints it to various scales to act as a template during fabrication. The sundials show solar time and can include longitude correction and equation of time. It also can draw ancient or unequal hours such as Italian and Babylonian and even draw azimuth and altitude curves. It has an animation feature so the shadow of the style can be simulated on the screen. The results can be copied as an image or a vector graphics (metafile or DXF) for use in CAD programs or machine tools.

In 2005, the French astronomical society, Société Astronomique de France (SAF) awarded Blateyron with the Julien Saget prize for the Shadows software.

The Astrolabes are interactive and can be manipulated on screen by rotating the Rete and the Alidade using the mouse.

Several curves and graphs are available: equation of time, solar graph with horizon mask, duration of the day, direction rose. 
It is now available in French, English, German, Spanish, Italian, Portuguese, Brazilian Portuguese, Dutch, Hungarian, Slovenian, Greek, Polish and Russian- the translation were provided by the users.

Features of the three levels of Shadows
Shadows is supplied in three versions.

Shadows: Freeware version
 Plane sundials with polar style (horizontal, vertical declining, equatorial, polar, meridian dial)
 Drawing of the sundial to scale 1; Any dimension, orientation or reclination
 Suitable for any location on Earth, on northern or southern hemisphere (2800 locations pre-installed)
 Drawing of the style to scale 1, ready to be cut out
 Tables of coordinates of hour lines and declination lines
 Drawing of declination arcs and hour lines (solar or mean time), with or without longitude correction
 Moveable, resizable text frames, with list of pre-installed mottoes
 Drawing of the curve of equation of time, in various shapes
 Drawing of compass and azimuth circle
 Full on-line help, user interface translated into 17 languages.

Shadows Expert: Intermediate version, shareware

(in addition to standard Shadows features)
 declining-reclining plane sundials
 Analemmatic sundials
 Cylindrical sundials (shepherd's dial, armillary sphere, ...)
 Tables of solar and astronomical ephemeris
 Drawing of Italian and Babylonian hours
 Insertion of images for decoration
 Export of data and images
 Drawing of the construction layout (epure)
 Simulation of the shadow cast by a roof
 Animation in orientation and reclination of the sundial
 Tool for the calculation of the wall orientation
 Direction rose
 Mariners astrolabe

Shadows Pro: Full version, shareware

(in addition to Shadows Expert features)
 planispheric and universal astrolabes
 vertical declining analemmatic sundial
 Bifilar sundials
 Drawings in azimuth and altitude
 Sidereal hours, unequal hours
 Animated 3D view of sundials
 3D view of multiple sundials
 Solar graph with horizon mask
 Export of drawings in WMF and DXF (AutoCAD)
 Export of animations in AVI
 Tool for the calculation of sundial parameters from a photograph
 Efficiency graph of a solar panel

History of versions 

 version 5.0 (March 2022)
 version 4.5 (June 2020)
 version 4.4 (August 2019)
 version 4.3 (May 2019)
 version 4.2 (October 2018)
 version 4.1 (November 2016)
 version 4.0 (June 2014)
 version 3.5 (August 2012)
 version 3.4 (November 2011)
 version 3.3 (December 2010)
 version 3.2 (January 2010)
 version 3.1 (July 2009)
 version 3.0 (May 2008)
 version 2.2 (January 2006)
 version 2.1 (January 2005)
 version 2.0 (March 2004)
 version 1.6 (January 2001)
 version 1.5 (February 1999)
 version 1.0 (September 1997)

See also 
 Deep-Sky Planner
 List of software for astronomy research and education
 Scottish sundial

References

External links 
 Official Web site of Shadows
 Gallery of sundials made by Shadows users
 The Astrolabe by James E. Morrison

Astronomy software